Junkhearts is 2011 British drama film directed by Tinge Krishnan. It won the Golden St. George at the 34th Moscow International Film Festival.

Cast
 Eddie Marsan as Frank
 Candese Reid as Lynette
 Tom Sturridge as Danny
 John Boyega as Jamal
 Romola Garai as Christine
 Shaun Dooley as Josh
 Nabil Elouahabi as Fisherman
 Bhasker Patel as Hasan

References

External links
 
 

2011 films
2011 drama films
British drama films
2010s English-language films
2010s British films